Football, Love, and Bullfighting (Spanish: Fútbol, amor y toros) is a 1929 Spanish film directed by Florián Rey and starring Guerrita, Ricardo Núñez and Modesto Rivas. The film was Rey's first sound film, but he was dissatisfied with the level of sound recording and made his next film in France.

Cast
Guerrita as flamenco singer 
Ricardo Núñez    
Modesto Rivas  
Carlos Rufart   
Blanca Suarez

References

External links

Films directed by Florián Rey
Spanish black-and-white films